The Houthi–Saudi Arabian conflict is an ongoing armed conflict between the Royal Saudi Armed Forces and Iran-backed Yemeni Houthi forces that has been taking place in the Arabian Peninsula, including the southern Saudi regions of Asir, Jizan, and Najran, and northern Yemeni governorates of Saada, Al Jawf, and Hajjah, since the onset of the Saudi Arabian-led intervention in Yemen in 2015.

Over the course of the conflict the Houthis have carried out attacks on military bases and outposts in Saudi Arabia.

Background

In their 2004 conflict against the government of Yemeni President Ali Abdullah Saleh, the Houthis accused Saudi Arabia of pressuring Saleh to crack down on their community, and of funding him with 25 billion. This accusation was denied by Saleh, and was not acknowledged by Saudi Arabia. The Houthis and pro-Houthi Yemen army units were deploying effective tactics. Usually, they would first deploy teams equipped with anti-tank guided missiles (ATGMs)—like Russian made 9M113 Konkurs, 9M113 Kornet-Es and a few BGM-71 TOWs—to take out specific vehicles or bunkers. BM-21s and BM-27s would then target nearest military bases and lay landmines along routes connecting with the Saudi Arabia–Yemen border. Meanwhile, pro-Houthi special forces would start assaulting the border outposts, while motorcycle mounted teams armed with RPG-7s and US-made M47 Dragons would infiltrate into the Saudi rear. Columns of Saudi Arabian Army (RSLF) forces would thus drive into unknown minefields, or rush into ambushes at places not directly hit by the fighting. Some raiding parties deployed into Saudi Arabia were armed with man-portable air defence systems (MANPADS), as well as M167 Vulcan towed anti-aircraft cannons. Although exact details of the effectiveness of either remain evasive, during the first year of the war they damaged numerous attack helicopters of the RSLF and the Royal Saudi Navy Forces (RSNF), thus forcing their crews to keep their distance.

Timeline

2015
As a result of the Saudi-led intervention in Yemen, the city of Najran was shelled by the Houthis on 5 May. The Saudi authorities temporarily closed local educational institutions and the Najran Domestic Airport.

2016

January–June
 On 31 January 2016, according to Iran's Fars News Agency, Yemeni forces allied with the Houthis fired 70 missiles and mortar shells at the Al-Qawiya and Jbal al-Dokhan military bases in Jizan province, killing at least 10 Saudi troops.
 Saudi interior sources announced on 25 July 2016 that clashes resulted in the deaths of five Saudi border guards.

July–September
 On 11 August 2016, after a one-year border ceasefire between the Houthis and Saudi Arabia expired, clashes resumed and the Houthis gained entrance into the west side of the city of Najran.
 On 16 August 2016, Houthi shelling killed 7 civilians, including 4 Saudis and 3 foreigners, in an industrial zone in Najran. 
 On 18 August 2016, Houthi fighters advanced 15 km into Najran, according to a pro-Houthi source.
 On 21 August 2016, a Saudi encampment in Najran was hit by a Houthi-fired Tochka ballistic missile, resulting in the deaths of at least 50 Saudi soldiers.
 On 26 August 2016, a power station near the border was hit by a Houthi-fired rocket. A three-year-old boy was killed by subsequent debris, and his nine-year-old brother was injured.
 On 28 August 2016, Saudi officials stated that a rocket fired from Yemen hit a family's home in Saudi Arabia, killing two children and wounding five others.
 On 30 August 2016, Pro-Houthi media published a video purportedly showing clashes in the Asir region, with images of dead Saudi soldiers and claims of dozens of Saudi casualties.
 On 4 September 2016, Shelling from Yemen killed a woman and 3 children, and injured 2 others.
 On 6 September 2016, Houthi fighters captured 3 villages in the Al-Khabuah area, according to a source close to them inside the Jizan region. 
 On 12 September 2016, the Saudi Defense Ministry acknowledged that 3 Saudi soldiers were killed and 2 were wounded by a Houthi mortar attack at a border position in Najran, while also claiming that there have been over 500 Houthi casualties since the start of the conflict in Najran.
 On 13 September 2016, Qatar confirmed that 3 of their soldiers had been killed the previous night by Houthi fighters in Najran.
 In mid-September, Houthi forces, backed by the Yemeni Republican Guard, reached the last village at Najran's southern perimeter. Houthi forces and their allies were reported to be attacking the village of Nahuqa, where they were engaged in a fierce battle with the Saudi Army and Hadi loyalists.
 On 24 September 2016, Major-General Hassan Almalsi, head of Houthi special forces, was killed while attempting to infiltrate into the Najran Region with a squad of Houthi fighters.

October–December
 On 4 October 2016, Houthi forces destroyed 3 Saudi Abrams M1A2 tanks in Najran.
 On 12 October 2016, Salafist fighters, including ultra-conservative Salafist leader Bassam al-Mehbar, took control of al-Buqa' border crossing in Saada province, Yemen, with the help of Saudi air support. It was the second time that Saudi-backed government forces tried to open up a new front against Houthis in the north by crossing from Saudi Arabia.
 On 13 October 2016, A Saudi spy drone was shot down by Houthi militias over Al-Qawiya military base in Jizan. On the same day, a Saudi military vehicle came under fire from Houthi forces, and a Saudi soldier was killed by Houthi snipers in the Al-Rabiah area of Jizan.
 On 30 October 2016, Houthi forces ambushed the Saudi Army convoy near Al-Biqa' Desert on the near the Yemeni-Saudi border after observing the latter's movements for several hours, killing scores of Saudi Army soldiers.
 On 1 November 2016, Houthi militias claimed to have shot down a drone flying over the Ailab area in Asir province with an anti-aircraft missile. This was the fourth time in 2 months that the Houthis had shot down a Saudi aircraft.
 On 8 November 2016, 5 Saudis were injured and 3 vehicles were damaged by a projectile fired from Yemen into the southwestern city of Jizan, according to the Saudi Civil Defense.
 On 10 November 2016, Houthis claimed to have taken control of the villages of Al-Kars and Al-Dafiniya, along with other villages in east of Al-Bahtit and south of Al-Qarn. Sources also said that Houthi militiamen had captured a bridge linking Jizan's Qaem Zubaid and Al-Ibadiya areas and the road to the nearby Al-Khubah area. The sources also said that scores of Saudi soldiers were killed and injured and six Saudi armored vehicles and 2 combat tanks destroyed. Saudi army helicopters had bombarded the Al-Khubah area in response. However, the claim cannot be independently verified by Saudi authorities. Also earlier on that day, Saudi authorities said at least 14 people had been injured in Dharan al-Janoub governorate, in the southwest near the Yemeni border, by projectiles fired from Yemen.
 On 15 November 2016, the Royal Saudi Air Defense Forces intercepted and destroyed the missile targeting Najran "without any damage", Saudi Press Agency reported.
 On 19 November 2016, a Saudi soldier was killed by a missile fired by the Houthis across the border into Asir province, the Saudi interior ministry said. The incident occurred hours before a 48 hours Saudi-imposed ceasefire began.
 On 22 November 2016, 1 Yemeni citizen was killed and 7 other expatriates were injured when projectiles fired from Yemeni territories hit a shopping center in Najran, according to the official spokesman of the Civil Defense Directorate.
 On 26 November 2016, Houthi fighters said late on Saturday that they fired a ballistic missile deep into Saudi border city of Khamis Mushait in Asir region, targeting Allamuza military base. Houthis said the missile fire came in retaliatory response to the Saudi-led continuing airstrikes on Yemeni cities. However, the Saudi-owned Alarabiya satellite TV reported that the Saudi defense forces intercepted and destroyed the missile in the air before it reached the city.
 On 1 December 2016, 3 Saudi soldiers were shot dead by the Yemeni Army and Houthis at the al-Dhabra military base in Jizan, while another was killed in attack on a base in the al-Rabu'ah town of Asir. 
 On 8 December 2016, The Rocket Battalion of Yemeni Army shelled Al-Hajir military Base in Asir, causing damage to the military installation. It also launched missile strikes on military installations inside Misyal and Thuwaylah, inflicting losses of lives and equipment on the Saudi military. On the evening of 8 December, a Saudi border guard was killed when a landmine exploded along a border road in Jizan region.
 On 22 December 2016, Saudi forces carried out a night-time military operation in the regions of Jizan and Najran killing 30 Houthi fighters.
 On 31 December 2016, 25 Houthi fighters were killed by Saudi coalition airstrike in Najran region.

2017
 In the afternoon of 14 January 2017, a Saudi corporal was killed at a border guards post in Najran region after came under attack as a result of shelling and intensive fire, the Saudi Interior Ministry said.
 On 18 January 2017, Houthi sources said that since the beginning of January 2017, over 16 Saudi soldiers have been killed by sniper fire in the Jizan region.
 On the morning of 1 February 2017, one Saudi soldier was shot dead in Saudi border city of Jizan when Houthi militias fired from Yemeni territory, Saudi Press Agency reported.
 On 9 February 2017, Houthi militiamen launched an ambush at Saudi soldiers passing through the Jizan Region, killing scores and seizing their weaponry, the attack took place at Al-Hathira area.
 On 13 February 2017, at least 7 Saudi soldiers have been killed in the past week in clashes with Houthi fighters, state media reported.
 On 24 February 2017, a Jordanian F-16 warplane crashed in Najran district, reportedly due to a technical error. The pilot survived.
 On 19 March 2017, at least 20 Houthi fighters were reportedly killed in an attempt to sneak into army positions in Souq al-Buqaa area in northern Saada province, near the Saudi border, according to the Saudi-backed Yemeni Army.
 On 23 March 2017, several Saudi soldiers were reportedly killed by cross-border Houthi missiles, the Houthi-run news agency said. Saudi soldiers were allegedly killed when rebel shelling hit military sites in Najran, Jizan and Asir provinces, a rebel official told Yemen's Saba news agency. However, the Saudi Interior Ministry announced the death of just one soldier on a border post in south Dhahran.
 On 10 April 2017, more fighting was reported at the southeastern region of Asir with Saudi Army vehicles being attacked and casualties.
 On 16 April 2017, one Saudi border guard was killed and 3 others injured in a mine explosion in Jizan province, the Saudi Interior Ministry said.
 On 25 April 2017, Saleh forces and Popular Committees sniped 3 Saudi soldiers.
 On 27 April 2017, Saudi Interior Ministry stated that 2 patrolling soldiers were killed in Al-Rdhaa Sector in Jizan Region as a result of land mine explosion and projectiles from neighbouring Yemen.
 In the first quarter of the year 2017 Houthi Yemeni snipers reportedly killed 119 Saudi soldiers.
 On 11 May 2017, Houthis captured a Saudi military base in Raboah, Asir province, killing and wounding several Saudi soldiers.
 On 28 May 2017, 3 Kingdom of Saudi Arabia Army personnel were ambushed by Houthis fighters, including a high-ranking officer at Asir.
 On 10 July 2017, Houthi fighters blow up a KSA military building after seizing vehicles and supplies.
 On 19 July 2017, more attacks on Saudi-backed personnel were reported including an IED that killed 3 soldiers. The Houthi media displayed footage of Saudi Soldiers being shot by snipers at Al-Talaa Base in the Jizan region.
 On 22 July 2017, the Houthi forces launched a Volcano H-2 missile on Saudi Arabia targeting the oil refineries in the Yanbu Province of Saudi Arabia. Houthis and Ali Saleh media claimed that the missile hit its target causing a major fire, while Saudi Arabia claimed that it was due to the extreme heat that caused one of the generators to blow up.
 On 27 July 2017, the Houthis forces launched approximately 4 Volcano 1 missiles at King Fahad Air Base; the Houthis said that the missiles had successfully hit their targets.
 On 5 November 2017, the Houthi Forces successfully launched a Volcano H-2 on Saudi Arabia targeting the capital Riyadh which garnered worldwide media attention. According to a Houthi spokesperson the missile hit its target, King Khalid International Airport, while Saudi Arabia claimed that it had downed the ballistic missile before it hit the airport.
 On 9 December 2017, the Houthi forces repelled a Saudi-led offensive on their defenses in the towns of Qiwah and Hamda in the Jizan Region. Several Saudi and Sudanese soldiers were killed.

2018
 On 11 and 12 January 2018, The Houthis fired ballistic missiles at Najran. These attacks were confirmed by Saudi sources, which also reported that both missiles had been shot down. 
 On 30 January 2018, Pro-Houthi sources reported an additional missile attack, aimed at Riyadh.
 On 11 and 14 February 2018, Houthi fighters that had infiltrated into Saudi Arabia engaged in combat with the Saudi Armed Forces, near the city of Najran. The Houthis were repelled, with the Saudi forces claiming to have killed more than 20 of them, and destroyed 3 vehicles with their Apache helicopters.
 On 20 February 2018, Houthi snipers shot and killed at least 5 Saudi soldiers in the kingdom's Jizan, Najran and Asir regions.
 On 22 February 2018, 3 Saudi-led coalition vehicles were targeted and destroyed along with 50 enemy militants of the 103rd and 151 Brigade.
 On 11 March 2018, Houthis launched a major attack on the Saudi army in Jizan, the attack began with artillery shelling that directly hit the ranks of the Saudi army. Meanwhile, Houthis targeted al-Marani camp and Saudi army positions in the village of al-Lahj. An engineering unit of the Houthis carried out an ambush and destroyed some Saudi-led force vehicles. The Saudi media acknowledged the deaths of 18 soldiers and injury of 5 others.
 On 26 March 2018, Houthis fired 7 ballistic missiles towards the Saudi capital of Riyadh, all of which were intercepted by Saudi systems. An Egyptian man was killed and two others were wounded.
 Pro-Houthis al-Masirah TV quoted Saudi sources as saying that 33 Saudi soldiers were killed and 12 others injured in Houthis retaliatory attacks in the first 10 days of April.

2019
On 14 May 2019, the Houthis carried out a drone attack that targeted the Saudi East–West Crude Oil Pipeline. The attack temporarily shut down the pipeline before it was reopened.
On 17 August 2019 Houthis attacked a Saudi Arabian oil and gas field in the remote town of Shaybah.
On 23 June 2019, Houthi rebels carried out a drone attack on Abha International Airport, killing a Syrian national and wounding  21.
On 26 August 2019, Houthi rebels fired a total of  10 Badr-1 ballistic missiles at the Jizan Airport in southwest Saudi Arabia. The retaliatory attack led to dozens of killings and injuries. Riyadh claimed that it intercepted six out of 10 missiles fired from Yemen. The same day Houthi forces reported an ambush of a group of Saudi led forces in Jabara Valley as part of Operation Victory from God.
On 14 September 2019, the Houthi rebels claimed the Abqaiq and Khurais drone attacks, which caused massive damage to Saudi oil facilities.
On 28 September 2019, the Houthi military spokesman Yahya Saree, announced that three Saudi-led brigades alongside KSA forces were sieged and defeated following a 72 hours battle south of Najran. Thousands of enemy forces were reported casualties with over 500 Saudi led forces killed and 2,000 captured and  15 vehicles burned out. According to the Houthi spokesman, the Saudi brigades were preparing for a major attack against the Houthis in retaliation to the attack on Abqaiq and Khurais oil facilities, however the Houthis were able to lure the Saudi troops into their trap. According to the Houthi military spokesman, the Saudis then conducted airstrikes targeting the Saudi captives but the spokesman assured the families of the captives that they were able to hide and protect them from the Saudi airstrikes. The following day Houthis showed video footage and pictures of alleged Saudi military vehicles lost after the battle. Catherine Shakdam from Next Century Foundation said that there is no reason to doubt the Houthi statement asserting that the videos and the images which the Houthis have shown, confirm the Houthi statement. According to The Guardian and the BBC, the claims at the Houthi press conference, could not be corroborated. Saudi Arabia has not confirmed nor denied the attack.
On 4 November 2019, a Houthis forces attack left 5 Saudi troops killed including two officers with both the rank of majors.

2020
On 23 June 2020, the Houthis launched a drone and missile attack to target the King Khalid Airport and the Defense Ministry headquarters in Saudi Arabia's capital of Riyadh.
On 10 September 2020, the Houthis claimed that they attacked an "important target" in Saudi Arabia's capital, Riyadh, using a ballistic missile and drones.
On 23 November 2020, a missile attack launched by the Houthis set fire to an oil tank of Oil Co. facility in Jeddah.
On 25 November 2020, Saudi-led coalition claimed to have destroyed a suicide boat that damaged a nearby ship.
On 9 December 2020, the Saudi-led coalition intercepted a drone launched by the Houthis against Saudi Arabia.

2021
 On 15 January 2021, the Saudi-led coalition intercepted 3 Houthi suicidal drones launched from Al Hudaydah.
 On 23 January 2021, the Saudi-led coalition intercepted an alleged Houthi-launched ballistic missile over Riyadh.
 On 20 January 2021, two Houthi ballistic missiles were intercepted by the United Arab Emirates.
 On 15 February 2021, the Houthis mentioned that they had struck Saudi Arabia's Abha International Airport and King Abdulaziz International Airport with drones. A Houthi spokesman said on Twitter that the attacks halted operations in the airports for two hours. The Saudi-led coalition said it intercepted drones towards the kingdom but did not confirm the attacks.
On 27 February 2021, Saudi Arabia intercept a missile and drones over Riyadh, believed to have been launched by Houthis.
On 5 March 2021, The Saudi-led coalition intercepted and destroyed six Houthi drones targeting Khamis Mushait city, southern Saudi Arabia.
 On 7 March 2021, a drone strike had been intercepted which targeted an oil storage yard at Ras Tanura.
 On 19 March 2021, another drone strike hit Riyadh oil refinery which caused a fire that was brought under control. The Houthis said that they launched six drones at a Saudi Aramco facility, and vowed to continue operations against Saudi Arabia as long as "its aggression against Yemen would continue".
On 20 March 2021, RSADF intercepted Houthi-launched suicide drones at the city of Khamis Mushait. the RSAF launched retaliatory air strikes against Houthi positions in Sana'a city. Areas hit by these strikes included Sana'a international airport, Houthi military camps south of the city, and military manufacturing sites north of the city.
On 23 March 2021, Tens of Houthi fighter were killed or injured in two separate confrontations with Hadi loyalists in Hajjah, one of these confrontations included an attempt of amphibious landing on Abs district with eight boats. Both attacks were repelled by Hadi forces. Later on that day RSAF launched air strikes on Houthi military targets in the capital Sanaa and the port of Salif on the Red Sea coast.
On 26 March 2021, Houthi forces launched rocket and drone attacks across Saudi Arabia installations causing fires at a Aramco distribution facility in Jizan, no casualties were reported. The RSADF intercepted 8 Houthi-launched suicide drones at the cities of Khamis Mushait, Najran and Jizan. latter on that day Saudi air defenses said they intercepted a ballistic missile over Najran.
On 27 March 2021, RSADF intercepted Houthi-launched suicide drone at the city of Khamis Mushait. On the same day, pro-Hadi Yemen Army captured the Al-Dhahra region and advanced towards the Tawunah Mountains and the Al-Rab’a region between the governorates of Al-Jawf and Saada.
On 28 March 2021, Saudi-led coalition intercepted three Houthi-launched drones over the city of Khamis Mushait and two explosive-laden boats. These boats were  launched from Red Sea port of Hodeidah.
On 30 March 2021, Saudi-led coalition intercepted two Houthi-launched suicide drone. One of these drones was destroyed in Yemeni skies while the other was intercepted above Jizan.
On 2 April 2021, Saudi-led coalition intercepted two Houthi-launched suicide drone fired toward Saudi Arabia's Khamis Mushait.
On 3 April 2021, Saudi-led coalition destroyed a remote-controlled booby-trapped boat in Salif.
On 9 April 2021,  Saudi-led coalition intercepted a Houthi-launched suicide drone over Jizan.
On 12 April 2021, Houthi forces launched rocket and drone attacks across Saudi Arabia using 15 drones and missiles, according to Houthis the attack targeted Jizan Airport and King Khalid Airbase. The Saudi-led coalition reported the interception of six drones and one ballistic missile over Jizan.
On 15 April 2021, RSADF intercepted five ballistic missile and four drones over the city of Jizan. The interception scattered debris on Jizan University's campus, which caused a fire that has been contained. No casualties were reported.
On 19 April 2021, The Saudi-led coalition intercepted an explosive-laden drone in Yemeni skies launched by the Houthi group towards Saudi Arabia.
On 22 April 2021, The Saudi-led coalition intercepted an explosive-laden drone launched by the Houthis towards city of Khamis Mushait, Saudi Arabia.
On 23 April 2021, Houthi forces said they launched a drone attack with a Qaseif-K2 drone at a military site in Saudi King Khalid airbase in Khamis Mushait. The Saudi led coalition said it intercepted a drone heading to the Saudi southern city, US envoy for Yemen Timothy Lenderking expressed concern over the escalating Houthi attacks targeting Saudi Arabia.
On 25 April 2021, The Saudi-led coalition intercepted an explosive-laden drone launched by the Houthis towards southern Saudi Arabia.
On 28 April 2021, The Royal Saudi Navy destroyed a remote-controlled explosives-laden boat in the Red Sea Port of Yanbu. No one has claimed the responsibility for the boat attack. 
On 2 May 2021, The Royal Saudi Air Defense Force (RSADF) intercepted an explosive-laden drone launched by the Houthi group towards Saudi Arabia. 
On 3 May 2021, The Royal Saudi Air Defense Force two intercepted an explosive-laden drones and one ballistic missile launched by the Houthi group over city of Najran. 
On 10 May 2021, The Royal Saudi Air Defense Force intercepted an explosive-laden drone launched by the Houthi group towards Khamis Mushait in southwest of Saudi Arabia. 
On 13 May 2021, Saudi air defenses have intercepted and destroyed eight drones and three ballistic missiles targeting Saudi Arabia. 
On 26 May 2021, The Saudi Civil Defense reported that several missiles fired by Houthis from inside Yemen landed in the Jazan Region, Saudi Arabia. Lt. Col. Mohannad bin Jasser Zailai, deputy media spokesman for the Civil Defense Directorate in Jazan region, said "authorities attended the site to find five missiles near a main road of one of the border villages in Jazan". no casualties were reported. 
On 28 May 2021, The Saudi-led coalition reported the interception of a Houthi drone targeting the southern region of Saudi Arabia. 
On 7 June 2021, The Royal Saudi Air Defense Force intercepted an explosive-laden drone launched by the Houthi group towards Khamis Mushait in southwest of Saudi Arabia. 
On 10 June 2021, The Royal Saudi Air Defense Force intercepted an explosive-laden drone launched by the Houthi group towards Khamis Mushait in southwest of Saudi Arabia. 
On 13 June 2021, Saudi press agency reported a Houthi attack by an explosive-laden drone on a school in Asir region, southern Saudi Arabia. No injuries were reported. The attack sparked international condemnations from US, Egypt, Arab gulf countries, Arab parliament, and OIC. 
On 14 June 2021, The Royal Saudi Air Defense Force intercepted a Houthi booby-trapped drone has been intercepted en route the Saudi southern city of Khamis Mushait.
On 17 June 2021, Houthis said they attacked Abha International Airport. Earlier that day, the Saudi-led coalition reported the interception of Houthi explosives-laden drone. 
On 19 June 2021, The Saudi-led Coalition said it intercepted seven explosive-laden drones launched by the Iran-backed Houthis towards southern Saudi Arabia. The drones were intercepted in the Yemeni Airspace. Later on that day, the Saudi-led Coalition reported the interception of another 10 drones, raising the total number to 17.
On 20 June 2021, The Saudi-led coalition said on Sunday that Saudi defenses had destroyed a drone launched by Yemen's Houthi militia toward southern Saudi Arabia. 
On 26 June 2021, The Saudi-led coalition said it destroyed an explosives-laden drone which was fired by the Houthi group towards the city of Khamis Mushait. 
On 28 June 2021, The Royal Saudi Air Defense Force intercepted and destroyed two ballistic missiles and three explosives-laden drones fired by the Houthi group towards the cities of Khamis Mushait and Najran in southern Saudi Arabia. 
On 1 July 2021, The Saudi-led coalition said  it shot down a new drone which fired by the Houthi group towards the Kingdom of Saudi Arabia. According to the Saudi Press Agency, the drone was intercepted inside the Yemeni territories. 
On 2 July 2021, The Saudi-led coalition said on Friday it thwarted an air attack by the Houthi group against the Kingdom of Saudi Arabia. 
On 4 July 2021, The Saudi-led coalition said it foiled a hostile attack with two booby-trapped boats in south of the Red Sea. On the same day, the coalition reported the interception of an explosives-laden drone which was fired by the Houthis towards the city of Khamis Mushait.
 On 31 August 2021, Houthis forces launched a drone attack on Abha International Airport in Saudi Arabia. According to Saudi authorities the attack left 8 civilians wounded and one civilian aircraft damaged.
On 1 September 2021, The Saudi-led coalition fighting Yemen's Houthi group said it had intercepted three explosive-laden drones over Yemen.
On 4 September 2021, The Saudi-led coalition said it intercepted and destroyed three booby-trapped drones launched by the Houthis toward Saudi Arabia.
On 22 September 2021, The Saudi-led coalition destroyed two explosive-laden boats in the coasts of Hodeidah before being launched to the sea. Latter, the coalition published a video showing the two boats being destroyed in air strikes.
On 23 September 2021, he Saudi-led coalition said it intercepted three explosive-laden Houthi drones that were heading towards the Kingdom and a ballistic missile that was targeting the Jazan region.
On 6 October 2021, The Saudi-Led coalition said it destroyed three explosives-laden boats in the Yemeni governorate of Hodeidah that had been readied for imminent attacks.
On 7 October 2021, Reuters reported that the Saudi-led coalition fighting in Yemen intercepted an explosives-laden drone targeting Saudi Arabia's Abha international airport. The coalition said "the drone's debris scattered, four workers at the airport were slightly injured, and the glass of some facades was shattered". Later on, The coalition said it destroyed the drone's launching site in the Yemeni province of Saada. The Saudi state TV reported that navigation traffic in the airport is normal after it was halted temporarily.
On 9 October 2021, Houthi forces launched two suicide drones on King Abdullah Airport in Jizan, Saudi Arabia. The attack left 10 wounded; six Saudi nationals, three Bangladeshi and one Sudanese as well as and minor damage to civilian property. SPA reported that the attack resulted in some minor damages, as well as shattered glasses at the airport.
On 12 October 2021, The Saudi-Led coalition has intercepted and destroyed a booby-trapped drone launched by Houthis towards Saudi Arabia's Khamis Mushait.
On 13 October 2021, Reuters reported that the Saudi-Led coalition destroyed two explosive-laden boats used in an attempted attack by the Houthi group in the south of the Red Sea.
On 21 October 2021, Houthi forces launched a ballistic missile attack on a Saudi military base in Jizan province. The attack left casualties. According to regional media and activists at least 6 Saudi officials and 12 other ranks were killed in the attack.
On 23 October 2021, The Saudi-led coalition said it had destroyed four explosive-laden Houthi boats in Yemen's western governrate of Hodeidah. A coalition statement said warplanes targeted Al-Jabanah coastal base, east of Hodeidah city, where the vessels had been prepared to attack international ships sailing through the Red Sea.
On 28 October 2021, The Saudi-led coalition said in a statement that Saudi Arabia's air defenses have intercepted and destroyed five ballistic missiles launched by Yemen's Iran-backed Houthi militia toward Jazan city.
On 2 November 2021, The Royal Saudi Air Defense Forces (RSADF) intercepted and destroyed two Houthi-launched drones targeting the city of Jazan. No damage or casualties have been immediately reported.
On 10 November 2021, Houthi media said its forces launched seven ballistic missiles, three in the Saudi region of Asir targeting KSA 1st Regiment base in the Dhahran and other four across Yemen. The attack coincided with the visit of UN envoy to Yemen to the port city of Mocha.
On 21 November 2021, the Houthi military fired missiles at Aramco buildings. Even an airport was targeted. Saudi Arabia responded by carrying out an air strike.
On 7 December 2021, Reuters reported that the Saudi-led coalition bombed military targets in the capital Sanaa after the Iran-aligned Houthis launched ballistic missiles and armed drones into Saudi Arabia. The coalition conducted "precision strikes on legitimate military targets in Sanaa" and in the last 24 hours also struck Houthi targets in Marib and Jouf, a coalition statement said. On the same day the coalition said a projectile fell near a public road and a local market in Jazan in the south of the kingdom.
On 16 December 2021, the Saudi-led coalition said in a statement that a hostile projectile fell in the industrial area of Ahad Al-Masarihah, Jazan region. Later on that day, the coalition said that it intercepted and destroyed two ballistic missiles fired toward Abha City, Asir region. Then the Saudi-led coalition announced that it has launched airstrikes on Houthi military targets in Sana'a.
On 20 December 2021, the Saudi-led coalition launched airstrikes on Sana'a International Airport. The strikes hit six targets, spokesman Brigadier General Turki Al-Malki said, including areas used for launching attacks by drones, training drone personnel, housing trainers and trainees, and storing drones. The coalition reportedly urged UN aid workers to evacuate the area before the strikes were carried out, according to Saudi state media.
On 24 December 2021,The Saudi Civil Defense said that a Houthi projectile hit the Samtah governorate in Jazan region resulting in two deaths of a citizen and a resident of Yemeni nationality, in the addition to the injury of seven civilians including six Saudi citizens and a Bangladeshi resident.

2022
 On 3 January 2022, Houthis seized a United Arab Emirates-flagged cargo ship Rawabi off the coast of Yemen on Sunday night. According to a Saudi-led coalition, the ship was carrying medical supplies used to operate a Saudi hospital on the island of Socotra and was sailing near Hodeida when it was attacked. According to the Houthis, the ship was carrying weapons. A crew of 11, seven Indians and 1 each from Ethiopia, Indonesia, Myanmar and the Philippines were detained by the Houthis.
 On 17 January 2022, three fuel trucks exploded, killing three people, and a fire broke out near Abu Dhabi Airport on Monday in what Yemen Houthis group said was an attack deep inside the United Arab Emirates Three people were killed and six wounded when three fuel tanker trucks exploded in the industrial Musaffah area near storage facilities of oil firm ADNOC, state news agency WAM said. It said those killed were two Indians and a Pakistani. On the same day, Royal Saudi Air Forces intercepted eight drone that were fired towards southern Saudi Arabia. Later, AL Ekhbariya released a footage for the interceptions.  
 On 21 January 2022, at least 70 people were reportedly killed in northern Yemen, when the Saudi-led military launched airstrikes on a Houthi-controlled region, including a prison in Yemen. The coalition also damaged the Internet infrastructure of the entire country, according to rebels in control of the area as well as international aid groups operating in the region. The airstrikes came a week after the Iran-back Houthi rebels launched a drone strike on the UAE, the coalition partner and regional ally of Saudi Arabia. The Republic Hospital near the Saudi border received approximately 70 dead bodies and 138 wounded people and surpassed its capacity of patients, as per Ahmed Mahat, head of Doctors Without Borders’ mission in Yemen. Meanwhile, the Saudi-led coalition denied targeting a Yemeni prison in the strikes, the statement disputes claims by the International Committee of the Red Cross that said more than 100 people were killed or wounded in the airstrike.  The coalition spokesman Brigadier General Turki Al-Malki said: "The allegations were confirmed to be incorrect after a comprehensive review of the post-action procedures (AAR) was conducted according to the internal mechanism of the Joint Forces Command of the Coalition", Al-Malki added "that media reports that have been marketed by the terrorist Houthi militia reflects its usual misleading approach, as the alleged target was not included in the No-strike list (NSL) according to the mechanism approved with the Office for the Coordination of Humanitarian Affairs in Yemen (OCHA)."
 On 24 January 2022, The Saudi-led Coalition said that two residents sustained minor injuries after the Houthis fired a ballistic missile that fell in the industrial area of Ahad Al-Masarihah in Jazan. The residents, of Sudanese and Bangladeshi origin, were wounded and workshops and civilian vehicles were damaged.
 On 27 January 2022, The Saudi-led coalition said it will look into last week's attack on a prison in Saada, Yemen, which killed dozens of people. The coalition denied the air raid previously and has now announced that it is reviewing the matter.
 On 31 January 2022, The UAE military said Monday that Iran-backed Houthi rebels in Yemen fired a ballistic missile at Abu Dhabi, just hours after Israel's president began a historic visit to the Persian Gulf country. The foiled strike was the third this month targeting Abu Dhabi, the Emirati capital.
 On 10 February 2022, After Saudi air defences intercepted and destroyed a drone near the kingdom's southern border with Yemen, at least 12 civilians were hurt by shrapnel.
 On 10 March 2022, the Saudi Press Agency reported that a drone attack on an oil refinery in Saudi Arabia's capital, Riyadh, started a small fire that did not cause injuries or affect supplies. The statement did not specify where the drone strike was launched from. Later on, the Houthis claimed responsibility for the drone strike. The attack caused a short dip in output at a refinery.
 On 20 March 2022, The Saudi-led coalition reported that Houthis fired missiles and drones at Saudi energy and water desalination facilities, causing a temporary drop in output at a refinery but no casualties. Later on that day, another Aramco distribution plant was attacked in the Red Sea city of Jeddah, leading to a fire in one of the tanks, according to the Saudi-led coalition. The fire was controlled and did not result in any casualties.
 On 25 March 2022, the Saudi-led military coalition said it destroyed nine explosive-laden drones launched by the Houthi group towards the southern, eastern and central areas of the kingdom. The Saudi Press Agency (SPA) released a video of the interception. Another ballistic missile, bound for the Red Sea port city of Jazan and one explosive-laden drone launched toward Najran, were intercepted later, according to the SPA. The coalition also reported a "limited fire" erupting at an electricity distribution plant with no fatalities in the town of Samtah in Jazan region following a rocket attack fired by Houthis. This was latter followed by another attack that targeted the National Water Company tanks in the Kingdom’s Dhahran Al Janub. Later on that day, there was another attack on Saudi energy facilities. The Saudi-led coalition said Aramco's petroleum products distribution station in Jeddah was hit, close to the Jeddah Corniche Circuit where the Formula One Saudi Arabian Grand Prix had been scheduled to take place that weekend, causing a fire in two storage tanks but no casualties. The attacks have also been reported to have increased the oil prices of Brent crude to 120 dollars per barrel, and U.S. West Texas Intermediate to 113 dollars per barrel.
 On 26 March 2022, Yemen's Houthis announced a three day ceasefire, and offered Saudi Arabia the prospect of a "permanent" ceasefire. The Saudi-led coalition responded by unleashing a barrage of airstrikes on Sanaa and Al-Hodeidah. At least seven people were killed.
 On 31 March 2022, Saudi Arabia listed 25 people and organisations of various nationalities to its terrorist list, alleging that they are involved in funding Yemen's Iran-aligned Houthi rebellion.
 On 3 April 2022, a Houthi military official said on Sunday, that the aggression forces committed 14 violations with artillery and missile attacks and 61 violations with various gunshots in the Hodeidah province.
 On 10 April 2022, The Arabic-language Al-Mayadeen television news network, citing a Yemeni military source speaking on condition of anonymity, reported that 2 victims died on Saturday night as Saudi military struck the Razih district in Sa'ada.
 On 13 April 2022, The United States Navy announced the formation of a new multinational task force to combat arms smuggling in the waters surrounding Yemen, the latest American military reaction to Houthi attacks on Saudi Arabia and the United Arab Emirates.
 On 28 April 2022, As part of a humanitarian move, the Saudi-led coalition operating in Yemen announced that it will release 163 prisoners from Yemen's Houthi militias.
On 6 May 2022, the Saudi-led coalition in Yemen said it transported more than 100 freed inmates to Yemen in conjunction with the International Committee of the Red Cross.
On 6 May 2022, the Houthi rebels said they are considering a request by the UN envoy to extend the ongoing truce with the Yemeni government, which expires on 2 June.
On 21 May 2022, Yemen's Houthi rebels said that they shot down a "spy drone" of the Saudi-led coalition, accusing the coalition of violating the ongoing truce.
On 2 June 2022, Yemen's warring sides agreed to extend a United Nations-brokered cease-fire for another two months on the same terms as the previous agreement, which was set to expire on Thursday, 2 June, according to the United Nations envoy to Yemen.
On 27 June 2022, Following the Iraqi prime minister's call for a renewal of negotiations between the regional adversaries, Saeed Khatibzadeh, a spokesman for Iran's foreign ministry, said at a news conference on Monday that Saudi Arabia wants to begin diplomatic discussions with Tehran.
On 29 August 2022, Yemen's government said, ten government soldiers were killed in an overnight rebel attack near the blockaded city of Taiz, during what it called a "dangerous escalation". The Yemeni army said 23 rebels were killed and 30 others were injured in the attack, without providing further details. The government said, the assault was aimed at cutting off a key route to the city.
On 5 November 2022, The military of the Yemeni government said, three Houthi rebels were killed in an attack by government forces in the southwestern Taiz province.
On 16 November 2022, Abdul Basit Al-Baher, a Yemeni military official in Taiz, told Arab News that the Houthis shelled an air defense military base in northwest Taiz before sending ground troops to attack the base. On 17 November, a military official told Xinhua, intense battles erupted between Yemen's government forces and the Houthi rebels in various areas of the southwestern governate of Taiz leaving four government soldiers and six Houthi fighters dead.

References

Conflicts in 2015
History of the Houthis
Wars involving Saudi Arabia
Wars involving Yemen
2010s conflicts
2020s conflicts